Wheatley Public School is a historic school building located at Poplar Bluff, Butler County, Missouri. It was built in 1928 population and remained so until the end of segregation in 1958. It is a two-story, "U"-plan, Colonial Revival style brick building with a central gymnasium. The building sits on a cast concrete foundation and has a flat roof.  It was constructed to serve the African-American student  It was listed on the National Register of Historic Places in 1998. 

Along with two other contributing buildings, it is part of the Garfield Historic District, listed on the National Register in 2017.

References

African-American history of Missouri
School buildings on the National Register of Historic Places in Missouri
Colonial Revival architecture in Missouri
School buildings completed in 1928
Buildings and structures in Butler County, Missouri
National Register of Historic Places in Butler County, Missouri
1928 establishments in Missouri